Reproof may refer to:

 Reproof (firearms), a test of a gun after its original proof
 Reproof, a form of congregational discipline among Jehovah's Witnesses
 Reproof, a less severe censure than a rebuke in English civil and church law
 "Reproof", a song on the EP HalfNoise by HalfNoise
 The Reproof, a painting by Emily Sartain

See also
 Reprimand, a severe, formal or official reproof
 Tocheichah (meaning admonition or reproof), the section in chapter 26 of Leviticus